Area code 242 is the telephone area code in the North American Numbering Plan (NANP) for The Bahamas. Area code 242 translates to the letter sequence BHA on an alpha-numeric keypad. The numbering plan area (NPA) was created in a split of area code 809, which was originally assigned to the Bahamas and many of the Caribbean islands. A permissive dialing period was in effect from October 1, 1996, to March 31, 1997.

When in The Bahamas, only the seven-digit number is required for local calls, but to call the Bahamas from other countries within the North American Numbering Plan, e.g., the United States, and Canada, the local number is prefixed with 1 and 242.

See also
List of NANP area codes
Area codes in the Caribbean

External links 
 List of exchanges from AreaCodeDownload.com, 242 Area Code

242
Communications in the Bahamas